Amy Fraser (born 29 March 1995) is a Canadian freestyle skier who competes internationally in the half-pipe discipline.

Career 
Fraser has been part of the national team since 2019. During the 2021-22 World Cup Season, Fraser finished in the top ten in three of four events, including a career-best 6th in Calgary.

On January 24, 2022, Fraser was named to Canada's 2022 Olympic team in the halfpipe event.

References

External links 
 

1995 births
Living people
Canadian female freestyle skiers
Sportspeople from Halifax, Nova Scotia
Freestyle skiers at the 2022 Winter Olympics
Olympic freestyle skiers of Canada